Izuo Anno (December 2, 1909 – December 18, 1939) was a Japanese Olympic athlete who participated in the 1932 Summer Olympics in Los Angeles. He was born in Yamaguchi Prefecture. He competed in the 100m and 200m sprints. He was 169 cm tall and weighed 63 kg. He was a graduate of Keio University. During the Second Sino-Japanese War, while undergoing his military service, he was killed in action in Nanning, Guangxi, Republic of China.

See also
Japan at the 1932 Summer Olympics

References

External links
Izuo Anno - Sports Reference（英語）

1909 births
1939 deaths
Sportspeople from Yamaguchi Prefecture
Japanese male sprinters
Olympic male sprinters
Olympic athletes of Japan
Athletes (track and field) at the 1932 Summer Olympics
Japan Championships in Athletics winners
Military personnel killed in the Second Sino-Japanese War
Japanese military personnel killed in action
Keio University alumni